Divi Divi Air Flight 014 (some sources refer to it as Flight 016), was a scheduled commuter flight from Hato International Airport in Curaçao to Flamingo International Airport in Bonaire carrying a single pilot and nine passengers, which on 22 October 2009 ditched in the Caribbean Sea off the Coast of Bonaire due to an engine failure.

Aircraft

The aircraft involved was a Britten-Norman BN-2A Islander, registration PJ-SUN. The aircraft made its first flight on 12 December 1973, and was therefore almost 36 years old at the time of the accident.

Accident

The flight originated from Hato International Airport of Curaçao en route to the Flamingo International Airport on the sister island of Bonaire. The aircraft departed from Curaçao at 09:48 with an estimated landing time of 10:13 at Bonaire. Approximately 10 minutes after departure the starboard engine failed in flight.

Moments before the ditching Mansell looked into the cabin and gave the thumbs up to the passengers, checking that their life vests were on.

During the ditching, at impact with the water surface, the cockpit door and left main landing gear were detached from the aircraft. All nine passengers survived the ditching and were rescued by a nearby diver's boat. The passengers reported that after the ditching, the pilot was injured and appeared to be unconscious as he did not try to remove himself from the aeroplane. The pilot actually went down with the aircraft despite the efforts of some passengers who tried to remove him from his seat while the aeroplane was sinking.

References

Aviation accidents and incidents in 2009
October 2009 events in North America
2009 in Bonaire
Accidents and incidents involving the Britten-Norman Islander
Airliner accidents and incidents involving ditching